The Walled town of Concarneau is a walled town built in the 15th and 16th century in Concarneau.

History

Description

Museums
  (Museum of Fishing)

Gallery

References

Bibliography
 
 
 
 
 
 
 

Buildings and structures completed in the 16th century
Buildings and structures in Finistère
Monuments historiques of Finistère
Museums in Finistère
Concarneau
Buildings and structures completed in the 15th century